Ramanakkapeta is a village in Krishna district of the Indian state of Andhra Pradesh. It is located in Musunuru mandal of Nuzvid revenue division.

According to memoir by Dr. Benjamin Heyne (1 September 1795)), this is a place where indigenous iron manufacturing method was practiced.

References 

Villages in Krishna district